Gina Loren Lewandowski (born April 13, 1985) is an American former soccer player.

University career
Lewandowski played her collegial soccer at Lehigh University, where she was named Patriot League Offensive Player of the Year (2004, 2005) and Patriot League Rookie of the Year (2003), she was led all scorers in League 2004 year with eight goals and 16 points. She finished her college career with 36 goals and 8 assists in 70 games. Then played 2006 for Northampton Laurels.

Professional career
Following university Lewandowski tried outs for two teams in Germany, heading overseas on May 22, 2007. Her desire to play lead her to "... go over and see where it takes me," Lewandowski said, "It's just a leap of faith."

1. FFC Frankfurt
Following a successful trial, the four-time All-Patriot League moved to 1. FFC Frankfurt with fellow American Alexandra Krieger on July 30, 2007. While at Frankfurt Lewandowski won the treble in 2007–08 (Bundesliga-Pokal-Champions League). She helped Frankfurt win the Pokal again in 2011. Lewandowski also went on to another Champion's League final in 2011–12, losing to Olympique Lyon.

Western New York Flash
Lewandowski left Frankfurt to play one season in the Women's Professional Soccer (WPS) league in the summer of 2011. She appeared 8 times for the Western New York Flash and helped the club win both the league and the championship. The WPS folded in the following off-season.

Bayern Munich
Lewandowski returned to Germany following the WPS, this time with Bayern Munich. From 2012 to 2019, she appeared in 119 times for the club in regular season games, scoring 18 times. Along with Bayern she won the Frauen-Bundesliga two more times in 2015 and 2016.

NJ/NY Gotham FC
Lewandowski signed with NJ/NY Gotham FC, a National Women's Soccer League (NWSL) team based in New Jersey, 90 minutes from where she grew up, on May 7, 2019. In January 2020, she signed a new one-year contract.

On May 30, 2022, she announced her plans to retire in July 2022.

International career
May 9, 2012, Lewandowski called up for the United States match against China.

On October 25, 2015, at age 30, Lewandowski earned her only cap for the United States in an international friendly (Victory Tour) match against Brazil, coming off the bench in the 74th minute to play left wingback.

Personal
Lewandowski, who was born in Bethlehem, Pennsylvania, was raised in nearby Coopersburg, Pennsylvania and graduated from Allentown Central Catholic High School. She received a degree in biology at Lehigh University. Gina has Polish ancestry and shares her surname with Robert Lewandowski, a star for Bayern Munich men's team during the same period, although the two are not known to be related.

Honors and awards

Club
1. FFC Frankfurt
 UEFA Women's Cup (1): Winner 2007–08
 German Cup (2): Winner 2007–08, 2010–11
 Bundesliga (1): Winner 2007–08

Bayern München
 Bundesliga (2): Winner 2014–15, 2015–16

Individual
2003: Patriot League Rookie of the Year
2004: Patriot League Offensive Player of the Year
2005: Patriot League Offensive Player of the Year

References

External links
 
Offizielle Homepage des 1.FFC Frankfurt
Gina Lewandowski at Lehigh
Gina Lewandowski Official blog on Women's Soccer United

1985 births
Living people
Allentown Central Catholic High School alumni
FC Bayern Munich (women) players
Lehigh Mountain Hawks women's soccer players
United States women's international soccer players
1. FFC Frankfurt players
Western New York Flash players
American expatriate soccer players in Germany
American women's soccer players
Frauen-Bundesliga players
Women's association football defenders
Women's association football midfielders
American people of Polish descent
NJ/NY Gotham FC players
National Women's Soccer League players
American expatriate women's soccer players
Women's Professional Soccer players
Sportspeople from Lehigh County, Pennsylvania
Charlotte Lady Eagles players
USL W-League (1995–2015) players